The 1999 Pittsburgh Steelers season was the franchise’s 67th season as a professional sports franchise and as a member of the National Football League. 

For the second consecutive season the Steelers failed to make the playoffs after starting off the season by winning 5 of their first 8 games. Losing seven of the remaining eight dropped Pittsburgh to 6–10 for the year, their worst record under Bill Cowher.

The 1999 Steelers are the only NFL team since at least 1940 to concede so many as five safeties in one season.

Offseason

NFL draft

Undrafted Free Agents

Personnel

Staff

Notable additions include Joey Porter and Aaron Smith.

Roster

Preseason

Schedule

Regular season

Schedule

Game summaries

Week 1 (Sunday September 12, 1999): at Cleveland Browns 

at Cleveland Browns Stadium, Cleveland, Ohio

 Game time: 8:20 PM EDT
 Game weather: 75 F Clear
 Game attendance: 73,138
 Referee: Bob McElwee
 TV announcers: (ESPN) Mike Patrick (play by play), Joe Theismann & Paul Maguire (color commentators), Solomon Wilcots (sideline reporter)

Scoring drives:

 Pittsburgh – Stewart 1 run (Brown kick)
 Pittsburgh – FG Brown 18
 Pittsburgh – Huntley 5 pass from Stewart (Brown kick)
 Pittsburgh – FG Brown 28
 Pittsburgh – Huntley 3 run (kick blocked)
 Pittsburgh – FG Brown 19
 Pittsburgh – Huntley 21 pass from Tomczak (Brown kick)
 Pittsburgh – Ward 1 pass from Tomczak (Brown kick)

Week 2 (Sunday September 19, 1999): at Baltimore Ravens  

at PSINet Stadium, Baltimore, Maryland

 Game time: 1:00 PM EDT
 Game weather: 
 Game attendance: 68,965
 Referee: Gerald Austin
 TV announcers: (CBS) Don Criqui (play by play), Steve Tasker (color commentator)

Scoring drives:

 Pittsburgh – Stewart 8 run (Brown kick)
 Baltimore – Rhett 2 run (Stover kick)
 Pittsburgh – Huntley 17 run (Brown kick)
 Baltimore – FG Stover 45
 Pittsburgh – FG Brown 32
 Baltimore – FG Stover 28
 Pittsburgh – FG Brown 28
 Baltimore – Ismail 19 pass from Case (Stover kick)
 Pittsburgh – FG Brown 36

Week 3 (Sunday September 26, 1999): vs. Seattle Seahawks  

at Three Rivers Stadium, Pittsburgh, Pennsylvania

 Game time: 1:00 PM EDT
 Game weather:  (Sunny)
 Game attendance: 57,881
 Referee: Phil Luckett
 TV announcers: (CBS) Kevin Harlan (play by play), Sam Wyche (color commentator), Marcus Allen (sideline reporter)

Scoring drives:

 Seattle – Hanks 23 interception return (Peterson kick)
 Seattle – Rogers 94 punt return (Peterson kick)
 Seattle – FG Peterson 45
 Seattle – FG Peterson 51
 Seattle – FG Peterson 41
 Seattle – FG Peterson 26
 Pittsburgh – FG Brown 33
 Seattle – FG Peterson 38
 Pittsburgh – Edwards 16 pass from Tomczak (Brown kick)

Week 4 (Sunday October 3, 1999): vs. Jacksonville Jaguars  

at Three Rivers Stadium, Pittsburgh, Pennsylvania

 Game time: 1:00 PM EDT
 Game weather:  (Partly Sunny)
 Game attendance: 57,308
 Referee: Dick Hantak
 TV announcers: (CBS) Verne Lundquist (play by play), Dan Dierdorf (color commentator), Bonnie Bernstein (sideline reporter)

Scoring drives:

 Jacksonville – McCardell 7 pass from Brunell (Hollis kick)
 PIttsburgh – FG Brown 48
 Jacksonville – FG Hollis 27
 Jacksonville – FG Hollis 41
 Jacksonville – Safety, Stewart fumbled ball out of end zone
 Jacksonville – Safety, Smeenge sacked Stewart in end zone

Week 5 (Sunday October 10, 1999): at Buffalo Bills  

at Ralph Wilson Stadium, Orchard Park, New York

 Game time: 1:00 PM EDT
 Game weather: 
 Game attendance: 71,038
 Referee: Ed Hochuli
 TV announcers: (CBS) Verne Lundquist (play by play), Dan Dierdorf (color commentator), Bonnie Bernstein (sideline reporter)

Scoring drives:

 Pittsburgh – Ward 12 pass from Stewart (Brown kick)
 Buffalo – Gash 2 pass from Flutie (Christie kick)
 Buffalo – Moulds 49 pass from Flutie (Christie kick)
 Buffalo – FG Christie 29
 Pittsburgh – Edwards 17 pass from Stewart (Brown kick)
 Buffalo – Riemersma 8 pass from Flutie (Christie kick)
 Pittsburgh – Bettis 1 run (Brown kick)

Week 6 (Sunday October 17, 1999): at Cincinnati Bengals  

at Cinergy Field, Cincinnati, Ohio

 Game time: 1:00 PM EDT
 Game weather: 
 Game attendance: 59,669
 Referee: Jeff Triplette
 TV announcers: (CBS) Gus Johnson (play by play), Brent Jones (color commentator)

Scoring drives:

 Pittsburgh – Bettis 1 run (Brown kick)
 Cincinnati – FG Pelfrey 37
 Pittsburgh – Bettis 5 run (Brown kick)
 Pittsburgh – FG Brown 43

Week 7 (Monday October 25, 1999): vs. Atlanta Falcons  

at Three Rivers Stadium, Pittsburgh, Pennsylvania

 Game time: 9:00 PM EDT
 Game weather:  (Clear)
 Game attendance: 58,141
 Referee: Ron Winter
 TV announcers: (ABC) Al Michaels (play by play), Boomer Esiason (color commentator), Lesley Visser (sideline reporter)

Scoring drives:

 Pittsburgh – Huntley 13 pass from Stewart (Brown kick)
 Pittsburgh – FG Brown 51
 Pittsburgh – FG Brown 25
 Atlanta – Mathis 5 pass from Chandler (Andersen kick)
 Atlanta – Safety, Miller stepped out of end zone

Week 8 (Sunday October 31, 1999): Bye Week

Week 9 (Sunday November 7, 1999): at San Francisco 49ers  

at 3Com Park, San Francisco, California

 Game time: 4:15 PM EST
 Game weather:  (Rain)
 Game attendance: 68,657
 Referee: Tom White
 TV announcers: (CBS) Greg Gumbel (play by play), Phil Simms (color commentator), Armen Keteyian (sideline reporter)

Scoring drives:

 Pittsburgh – Bettis 1 run (Brown kick)
 San Francisco – FG Richey 19
 Pittsburgh – Ward 13 pass from Stewart (Brown kick)
 PIttsburgh – FG Brown 28
 San Francisco – FG Richey 20
 Pittsburgh – FG Brown 38
 Pittsburgh – Bettis 22 run (Brown kick)

Week 10 (Sunday November 14, 1999): vs. Cleveland Browns  

at Three Rivers Stadium, Pittsburgh, Pennsylvania

 Game time: 1:00 PM EST
 Game weather:  (Partly Sunny)
 Game attendance: 58,213
 Referee: Johnny Grier
 TV announcers: (CBS) Craig Bolerjack (play by play), Beasley Reece (color commentator)

Scoring drives:

 Cleveland – K. Johnson 35 pass from Couch (Dawson kick)
 Pittsburgh – FG Brown 41
 Pittsburgh – FG Brown 32
 Pittsburgh – Huntley 5 run (run failed)
 Pittsburgh – FG Brown 47
 Cleveland – Edwards 5 pass from Couch (run failed)
 Cleveland – FG Dawson 39

Week 11 (Sunday November 21, 1999): at Tennessee Titans  

at Adelphia Coliseum, Nashville, Tennessee

 Game time: 1:00 PM EST
 Game weather: 
 Game attendance: 66,619
 Referee: Mike Carey
 TV announcers: (CBS) Don Criqui (play by play), Steve Tasker (color commentator)

Scoring drives:

 Tennessee – McNair 2 run (Del Greco kick)
 Pittsburgh – Edwards 15 pass from Stewart (Brown kick)
 Tennessee – McNair 3 run (Del Greco kick)
 Tennessee – Safety, Stewart penalized for intentional grounding in end zone
 Pittsburgh – FG Brown 24

Week 12 (Sunday November 28, 1999): vs. Cincinnati Bengals  

at Three Rivers Stadium, Pittsburgh, Pennsylvania

 Game time: 1:00 PM EST
 Game weather:  (Mostly Sunny)
 Game attendance: 50,907
 Referee: Walt Coleman
 TV announcers: (CBS) Bill Macatee (play by play), Beasley Reece (color commentator)

Scoring drives:

 Cincinnati – Scott 76 pass from Blake (Pelfrey kick)
 Cincinnati – Blake 4 run (Pelfrey kick)
 Pittsburgh – FG Brown 35
 Cincinnati – Heath 58 interception return (Pelfrey kick)
 Cincinnati – FG Pelfrey 29
 Pittsburgh – FG Brown 33
 Pittsburgh – Shaw 15 pass from Tomczak (Brown kick)
 Pittsburgh – Ward 34 pass from Tomczak (Brown kick)
 Cincinnati – FG Pelfrey 29

Week 13 (Thursday December 2, 1999): at Jacksonville Jaguars  

at Alltel Stadium, Jacksonville, Florida

 Game time: 8:20 PM EST
 Game weather: 
 Game attendance: 68,806
 Referee: Bill Carollo
 TV announcers: (ESPN) Mike Patrick (play by play), Joe Theismann & Paul Maguire (color commentators), Solomon Wilcots (sideline reporter)

Scoring drives:

 Pittsburgh – FG Brown 40
 Jacksonville – FG Hollis 25
 Jacksonville – FG Hollis 32
 Pittsburgh – FG Brown 39
 Jacksonville – Smith 27 pass from Brunell (Hollis kick)
 Jacksonville – Stewart 1 run (Hollis kick)

Week 14 (Sunday December 12, 1999): vs. Baltimore Ravens  

at Three Rivers Stadium, Pittsburgh, Pennsylvania

 Game time: 1:00 PM EST
 Game weather:  (Partly Sunny)
 Game attendance: 46,715
 Referee: Jeff Triplette
 TV announcers: (CBS) Ian Eagle (play by play), Mark May (color commentator)

Scoring drives:

 Pittsburgh – Ward 21 pass from Bettis (Brown kick)
 Baltimore – Holmes 64 run (Stover kick)
 Pittsburgh – FG Brown 31
 Baltimore – FG Stover 19
 Baltimore – Ismail 54 pass from Banks (Stover kick)
 Pittsburgh – Edwards 6 pass from Tomczak (Brown kick)
 Baltimore – Ismail 59 pass from Banks (Stover kick)
 Baltimore – Ismail 76 pass from Banks (Stover kick)
 Pittsburgh – Stewart 11 pass from Tomczak (Brown kick)

Week 15 (Saturday December 18, 1999): at Kansas City Chiefs  

at Arrowhead Stadium, Kansas City, Missouri

 Game time: 12:30 PM EST
 Game weather: 
 Game attendance: 78,697
 Referee: Larry Nemmers
 TV announcers: (CBS) Verne Lundquist (play by play), Dan Dierdorf (color commentator), Bonnie Bernstein (sideline reporter)

Scoring drives:

 Pittsburgh – T. Edwards 12 pass from Tomczak (Brown kick)
 Kansas City – Gonzales 15 pass from Grbac (Stoyanovich kick)
 Pittsburgh – FG Brown 42
 Kansas City – D. Edwards 28 interception return (Stoyanovich kick)
 Kansas City – Gonzales 2 pass from Grbac (Stoyanovich kick)
 Pittsburgh – FG Brown 47
 Kansas City – Alexander 82 run (Stoyanovich kick)
 Kansas City – Morris 10 run (Stoyanovich kick)
 Pittsburgh – Shaw 11 pass from Tomczak (pass failed)

Week 16 (Sunday December 26, 1999): vs. Carolina Panthers  

at Three Rivers Stadium, Pittsburgh, Pennsylvania

 Game time: 1:00 PM EST
 Game weather:  (Light Snow)
 Game attendance: 39,428
 Referee: Bob McElwee
 TV announcers: (FOX) Ray Bentley (play by play), Ron Pitts (color commentator), Alby Oxenreiter (sideline reporter)

Scoring drives:

 Pittsburgh – FG Brown 46
 Pittsburgh – Davis 102 fumble return (Brown kick)
 Carolina – Lane 41 run (Kasay kick)
 Pittsburgh – Huntley 25 run (fumbled snap)
 Carolina – Jeffers 88 pass from Beuerlein (kick failed)
 Pittsburgh – Ward 9 pass from Tomczak (Brown kick)
 Carolina – Jeffers 43 pass from Beuerlein (Kasay kick)
 Pittsburgh – Bettis 8 run (Brown kick)

Week 17 (Sunday January 2, 2000): vs. Tennessee Titans  

at Three Rivers Stadium, Pittsburgh, Pennsylvania

 Game time: 4:15 PM EST
 Game weather:  (Mostly Cloudy)
 Game attendance: 48,025
 Referee: Tom White
 TV announcers: (CBS) Don Criqui (play by play), Steve Tasker (color commentator)

Scoring drives:

 Tennessee – Wycheck 9 pass from McNair (Del Greco kick)
 Pittsburgh – Huntley 8 run (Brown kick)
 Tennessee – Thomas 11 run (Del Greco kick)
 Tennessee – Wycheck 26 pass from O'Donnell (Del Greco kick)
 Tennessee – Kearse 14 fumble return (Del Greco kick)
 Tennessee – FG Del Greco 42
 Pittsburgh – Ward 15 pass from Tomczak (Ward pass from Tomczak)
 Tennessee – Safety, Thorton sacked Tomczak in end zone
 Tennessee – Roan 24 pass from O'Donnell (Del Greco kick)
 Pittsburgh – Bettis 1 run (Brown kick)
 Pittsburgh – Porter 46 fumble return (Brown kick)
 Tennessee – Walker 83 fumble return (Del Greco kick)
 Pittsburgh – Shaw 35 pass from Tomczak (Brown kick)

Standings

Notes

References

External links 
 1999 Pittsburgh Steelers season at Pro Football Reference 
 1999 Pittsburgh Steelers season statistics at jt-sw.com 

Pittsburgh Steelers seasons
Pittsburgh Steelers
Pitts